Sermizelles is a commune in the Yonne department in Bourgogne-Franche-Comté in north-central France.

Located close by is the Château de Domecy-sur-le-Vault.

See also
Communes of the Yonne department

References

Communes of Yonne